Francis Joseph Prendergast (13 July 1933 – 19 February 2015) was an Irish lecturer and Labour Party politician who served for four years in Dáil Éireann, as a Teachta Dála (TD) for Limerick East. He also served two terms as Mayor of Limerick city. Prendergast was an Irish Transport and General Workers' Union (ITGWU) official.

He was educated by the Christian Brothers in Limerick, he received a Diploma in Social and Economic Science from University College Cork and an MA in Industrial relations from Keele University in England.

He first stood as a candidate for Dáil Éireann at the 1981 general election, as the running-mate of sitting TD Michael Lipper. Both Labour candidates were defeated by the independent socialist Jim Kemmy. Prendergast did not contest the February 1982 general election, but stood again as the sole Labour candidate at the November 1982 general election and regained the seat for Labour.

Kemmy regained the seat by a wide margin at the 1987 general election, and Prendergast did not stand again. Kemmy's Democratic Socialist Party merged with the Labour Party in 1990, and the two men continued to serve on Limerick City Council. Prendergast had been Mayor of Limerick twice, from 1977 to 1978 and 1984 to 1985.

He died on 19 February 2015, aged 81.

References

Labour Party (Ireland) TDs
1933 births
2015 deaths
Alumni of Keele University
Members of the 24th Dáil
Mayors of Limerick (city)
Local councillors in County Limerick
Alumni of University College Cork